AS Cannes is a professional men's volleyball club based in Cannes, France. They were relegated to Ligue B, the second tier competition in French volleyball after the 2021–22 season.

Honours

Domestic
 French Championship
Winners (10): 1980–81, 1981–82, 1982–83, 1985–86, 1989–90, 1990–91, 1993–94, 1994–95, 2004–05, 2020–21

 French Cup
Winners (5): 1984–85, 1992–93, 1994–95, 1997–98, 2006–07

International
 CEV European Champions Cup 
Silver (1): 1982–83

 CEV Cup
Winners (1): 1998–99
Silver (1): 1992–93

 CEV Challenge Cup
Winners (1): 1980–81

References

External links
 Official website 
 Team profile at Volleybox.net

French volleyball clubs
Sport in Cannes
Volleyball clubs established in 1942
1942 establishments in France